Neville Powell (born 2 September 1963) is a Welsh football manager and former professional player who was most recently director of football at Aberystwyth Town.

Career
Powell began his playing career at Tranmere Rovers, making a goalscoring debut for the club at the age of 17 on 1 March 1981 in a match against Torquay United. He left the club in 1984 having made 86 appearances for the Prenton Park club, scoring four goals. He went on to spend eight years with Bangor City, playing for the club in the first season of the Welsh Premier League.

In 1993, he took over as player-manager of Connah's Quay Nomads, where his playing career came to an end following a broken leg sustained during a game against Llansantffraid on the opening day of the 1996–97 season. After 14 years in charge at Connah's Quay, Powell took over as manager of Bangor City in 2007, replacing Steve Bleasdale.

Bangor under Neville Powell have been very successful, beating FC Honka in the Europa League 3–2 on aggregate in July 2010, also winning the Welsh Cup for three consecutive years (2008–2010) and winning the Welsh Premier League in the 2010–11 season after starting the season with 15 consecutive wins, a run which was acknowledged across Europe.

On 25 July 2016, news broke that Neville Powell had been "relieved of his duties", according to a statement released by the club.

On 11 July 2017, Powell was named as manager of Aberystwyth Town. On 28 March 2018 the club announced Powell would become director of football and Irish coach Seamus Heath would become manager.

On 6 May 2020, Powell left Aberystwyth Town.

Career statistics

Managerial statistics

Honours

Player
Bangor City
 Northern Premier League runner-up: 1986–87
 Welsh Cup: finalist 1984–85

 Northern Premier League President's Cup: 1989

Connah's Quay Nomads
 Welsh League Cup: 1995–96

Managerial
Connah's Quay Nomads
 Welsh League Cup: 1995–96

Bangor City
 Welsh Premier League: 2010–11
 Welsh Cup: 2007–08, 2008–09, 2009–10; finalist 2010–11
 Welsh League Cup; finalist 2008–09, 2017–18

Individual
Welsh Premier League Manager of the Month: January 2018, December 2011, December 2010, September 2010, December 2009, November 2007
Welsh Premier League Manager of the Year: 2009–10, 2010–11

Notes

References

External links
Welsh Premier profile

1963 births
Living people
People from Flint, Flintshire
Sportspeople from Flintshire
English footballers
English football managers
Tranmere Rovers F.C. players
Bangor City F.C. players
Connah's Quay Nomads F.C. players
English Football League players
Cymru Premier players
Connah's Quay Nomads F.C. managers
Bangor City F.C. managers
Cymru Premier managers
Aberystwyth Town F.C. managers
Association football midfielders